The Pacific Coast Junior Heavyweight Championship was a professional wrestling championship that was contended for in the Pacific Northwest from the early 1940s until 1957. When the title was retired in 1957, it was the top singles title in the Pacific Northwest area.

Title history
Key

Footnotes

References

Pacific Northwest Wrestling championships
National Wrestling Alliance championships
Junior heavyweight wrestling championships